Angelos Theotokatos (born 10 October 1939) is a Greek boxer. He competed at the 1968 Summer Olympics and the 1972 Summer Olympics. At the 1972 Summer Olympics, he defeated Lema Yemane of Ethiopia, before losing to Louis Self of the United States.

References

1939 births
Living people
Greek male boxers
Olympic boxers of Greece
Boxers at the 1968 Summer Olympics
Boxers at the 1972 Summer Olympics
Mediterranean Games bronze medalists for Greece
Mediterranean Games medalists in boxing
Competitors at the 1967 Mediterranean Games
Bantamweight boxers
Sportspeople from the Ionian Islands (region)
People from Paliki
20th-century Greek people